Hacıqaib (also, Hacıqayıb, Gadzhigaib, Gadzhigaibkyshlakh, Gadzhigaibkyshlakh, and Gadzhygaib) is a village and municipality in the Quba Rayon of Azerbaijan.  It has a population of 1,310.  The municipality consists of the villages of Hacıqaib and Mirzəqasım.

References

External links

Populated places in Quba District (Azerbaijan)